Melzem Teichett  is a village and rural commune in Mauritania.

References 

Communes of Mauritania